Valkmar Erich "Val" Schneider is a retired Canadian football executive and player.

Schneider grew up in Boyle Street in Edmonton, Alberta and attended Victoria Composite High School. He attended the University of Alberta, earning a BPE degree in 1966, and Masters of Arts degree in 1969. While attending the University, he also played on their football team from 1963 to 1968, winning four Western Intercollegiate Football League Championships, a Vanier Cup finalist in 1965, and a Vanier Cup championship in 1967. Schneider was a co-captain of the 1967 Vanier Cup winning team (serving as co-captain from 1965 to 1967), and was awarded the Ted Morris Memorial Trophy as the team's MVP. He is also a four-time WIFL all-star.

He was later a professor, athletic administrator and coach, teaching at Red Deer College in the 1970s, coaching the Red Deer Packers football team, serving as the University of Saskatchewan's athletic director from 1980 to 1991, as head coach of the University of Saskatchewan Huskies football team from 1973 to 1983, with the exception of 1979, and as an assistant dean of the College of Physical Education at the University of Saskatchewan. He was also an assistant coach for nine years with the Huskies, including when they won the Vanier Cup in 1990. He has also served as an administrator with the Canada West University Athletic Association, and Canadian Intercollegiate Athletic Union. He retired from Canada West as executive director in 2012, after being affiliated with them in some capacity since the 1970s (previously known as the Canada West Athletic Association prior to a 1999 merger).

He was named to the University of Alberta's Sports Wall of Fame in 1999, the Vanier Cup Honour Roll in 1987, the University of Saskatchewan Wall of Fame in 2007, and is also a member of the Saskatoon Sports Hall of Fame. He also received the CIS Austin-Matthews Award in 2003. Schneider is married to Gloria and has two daughters and a son. His son Brent played university football, and was a Vanier Cup MVP twice in, in 1994 and 1996, with the Saskatchewan Huskies.

References

Alberta Golden Bears football players
Living people
Players of Canadian football from Alberta
Canadian football people from Edmonton
Year of birth missing (living people)